Southern Shops is a census-designated place (CDP) in Spartanburg County, South Carolina, United States. The population was 3,767 at the 2010 census.

Geography
Southern Shops is located at  (34.989699, -81.987468).

According to the United States Census Bureau, the CDP has a total area of 3.5 square miles (9.2 km2), all land.

Demographics

2020 census

As of the 2020 United States census, there were 3,663 people, 949 households, and 663 families residing in the CDP.

2000 census
As of the census of 2000, there were 3,707 people, 1,164 households, and 735 families residing in the CDP. The population density was 1,043.1 people per square mile (403.2/km2). There were 1,278 housing units at an average density of 359.6/sq mi (139.0/km2). The racial makeup of the CDP was 67.28% White, 14.76% African American, 0.81% Native American, 0.78% Asian, 12.73% from other races, and 3.64% from two or more races. Hispanic or Latino of any race were 25.09% of the population.

There were 1,164 households, out of which 29.5% had children under the age of 18 living with them, 41.8% were married couples living together, 14.2% had a female householder with no husband present, and 36.8% were non-families. 30.2% of all households were made up of individuals, and 11.3% had someone living alone who was 65 years of age or older. The average household size was 2.67 and the average family size was 3.30.

In the CDP, the population was spread out, with 21.6% under the age of 18, 14.2% from 18 to 24, 37.3% from 25 to 44, 17.4% from 45 to 64, and 9.5% who were 65 years of age or older. The median age was 32 years. For every 100 females, there were 147.3 males. For every 100 females age 18 and over, there were 154.8 males.

The median income for a household in the CDP was $25,268, and the median income for a family was $31,290. Males had a median income of $19,513 versus $17,991 for females. The per capita income for the CDP was $12,268. About 20.6% of families and 22.3% of the population were below the poverty line, including 30.1% of those under age 18 and 11.1% of those age 65 or over.

Education
Most of Southern Shops is in Spartanburg County School District 6, while a portion is in Spartanburg County School District 2.

References

Census-designated places in Spartanburg County, South Carolina
Census-designated places in South Carolina